This list of preserved steam locomotives in New South Wales makes no claim to being complete.

While there are many surviving examples of several locomotive classes, some are in a very poor condition, including partly dismantled or badly corroded locomotives, the technical condition of which cannot really be accurately conveyed in their descriptions.

New South Wales X10 class locomotives in preservation are fully listed <here>

New South Wales Government Railways

NSW Private Railways

References

Sources 
RailCorp: RailCorp S170 Heritage and Conservation Register. NSW Department of Environment and Heritage 2012